Zhongguancun Station is a station on Line 4 of the Beijing Subway, located in the Zhongguancun area of the Haidian District.

Station layout 
The station has an underground island platform.

Exits 
There are 7 exits, lettered A1, A2, B, C, D1, D2, and E. Exit A1 is accessible.

External links
 

Zhongguancun
Beijing Subway stations in Haidian District
Railway stations in China opened in 2009